The Victoria Award, earlier called the Victoria Scholarship is awarded to a Swedish athlete (or pair of athletes) every year since 1979, on Öland, on the 14 July, the birthday of Victoria, Crown Princess of Sweden.

Recipients of the Victoria Award

References

External links
 Official web page

1979 establishments in Sweden
Awards established in 1979
House of Bernadotte
Scholarships in Sweden
Swedish sports trophies and awards
Öland
Sport in Kalmar County
Borgholm Municipality